The Paul Mellon Arts Center (PMAC) is an arts building on the campus of Choate Rosemary Hall, Wallingford, Connecticut designed by architect I. M. Pei.

The original design began in 1968 and the building was completed in 1972. It was funded in large part by school alumnus Paul Mellon, who was also responsible as the National Gallery's president for Pei's commission for the East Building of the National Gallery of Art, Washington, D.C. at roughly the same time.

Structure

The physical structure has a rectangular footprint but is divided into two wings: the Theater Wing, which houses a 760-seat, two level proscenium theater as well as a black box theater; and the Triangle Wing, which has five levels of practice rooms, art studios, classrooms, offices, and a recording studio. The two wings are connected underground by the black box theater.

The building was constructed around the time at which the Rosemary Hall school for girls and the Choate School for boys joined to become a single, coeducational institution and quickly became a physical and symbolic link between the two campuses. Today, it retains less of this meaning, for the two schools' campuses are no longer separated as they were in the early 1970s.

External links
 Pei Cobb & Freed's Building Description

I. M. Pei buildings
Buildings and structures in Wallingford, Connecticut
Tourist attractions in New Haven County, Connecticut